No Fuel Left for the Pilgrims is the third (and first international) studio album by Danish rock band D-A-D. The album was released on 3 March 1989 in Denmark by Medley Records and worldwide on 8 September 1989 by Warner Bros. The band was still called Disneyland After Dark on the original Danish release but changed their name to D-A-D for the international release to avoid a lawsuit from The Walt Disney Company. For the international version tracks 1, 3, 4 & 7 were remixed by Chris Lord-Alge at Image Recording in Los Angeles.

It was the band's most popular release, largely due to the inclusion of the minor hits "Rim of Hell" and "Sleeping My Day Away". The album reached #116 on the US Billboard 200 chart, while the album's first single "Sleeping My Day Away" reached #23 on Billboard'''s Album Rock Tracks chart and #87 on the UK Singles Chart. The album has sold 600,000 copies worldwide, including 275,000 in Denmark and 100,000 in the US.

Tracks from this album were recorded live for the Osaka After Dark EP, released the following year.

In 2019, the album was featured on Rolling Stone'' magazine's list of the 50 Greatest Hair Metal Albums of All Time.

Track listing

Personnel
Adapted from the album's liner notes.
D-A-D
Jesper Binzer – vocals, rhythm guitar
Stig Pedersen – bass, backing vocals
Jacob Binzer – lead guitar, backing vocals
Peter L. Jensen – drums
Technical
D-A-D – producer, mixing, arrangements
Nick Foss – producer, mixing
Lars Overgaard – co-producer, engineer, mixing
Poul Bruun – mixing
Chris Lord-Alge – remixing (tracks 1, 3, 4 & 7 on international edition)
Jeremy Allom – engineer
Rene Cambony – engineer
Axel Strandberg – engineer
Oli Poulsen – engineer
John Kronholm – engineer
Thomas Brekling – engineer
Man Overboard – cover design
Lars Colberg – cover photography
Ulf Bjerre – cover photography

Charts

References

External links
 This album on D-A-D's official homepage

1989 albums
Albums produced by Nick Foss
D.A.D. (band) albums